Oomerabad or Umarabad is a village in Tirupathur district, Tamil Nadu, India. It is part of Ambur Taluk. 

The name Oomerabad refers to its founder Kaka Mohammed Oomer, and the word Abad which means "inhabited".

Geography
The major population comprises people following Islam and Hinduism

Transportation
Oomerabad is at a distance of 8 km by road from the leather hub Ambur. It is well connected by State highways. The nearest railway station is in Ambur. The nearest international airports are Chennai International Airport (190 km) and Bengaluru International Airport (180 km) and Vellore airport (49.1 km)

Hospital
The village also has a hospital run by the Management of Jamia Darussalam called Jamia Darussalam Hospital. The hospital has laboratory, maternity facilities and out-patient services. Besides serving Oomerabad people, it also serves the surrounding villages and towns including Ambur, Gudiyattam, Vaniyambadi and Pernambut.

Weather

Architecture

The Architecture of Oomerabad is a confluence of many architectural styles. From ancient Mosques and home with etching, beautiful tombs & minarets. The Architecture of Oomerabad has been featured in various newspapers. While Most of the Architecture are Indo-Saracenic , now at the 21st century steel, cement & Chrome building have become quite common

See also
JAMIA Darussalam University
Kaka Mohammed Oomer

References

Villages in Tirupathur district